Conosmilia is an extinct genus of corals in the family Flabellidae. C. elegans is from the Tertiary of South Australia (Geelong, Victoria, South Australia).

See also 
 List of prehistoric hexacoral genera

References 

Prehistoric Hexacorallia genera
Scleractinia genera
Flabellidae
Fossils of Australia
Cenozoic invertebrates